Minimanachis  is a small genus of sea snails in the family Columbellidae, the dove snails.

Species
 Minimanachis exigua Pelorce, 2020
 Minimanachis hartmanni (Espinosa & Ortea, 2014)
 Minimanachis karukeraensis (Pelorce & Faber, 2013)
 Minimanachis pulla Pelorce, 2020

References

 Pelorce J. (2020). Les Columbellidae collectés dans les eaux profondes autour de l'île de Guadeloupe (Antilles Françaises) pendant la campagne KARUBENTHOS 2 (2015) du Muséum National d'Histoire Naturelle. Iberus. 38(1): 55-111.

External links
 

Columbellidae